DeNoble is a surname of French origin, originating as a surname referring to someone of high birth. Notable people with the surname include:

Jerre DeNoble (1923-2011), American outfielder
William DeNoble (1924-2007), American trade unionist